Frederick or Fred Rose may refer to:
Frederick Rose (surgeon) (died 1873), British naval surgeon awarded the American Congressional Gold Medal
Frederick Campbell Rose (1865–1946), Scottish irrigation engineer working in India
Fred Rose (songwriter) (1897–1954), songwriter and publisher of country music
Fred Rose (politician) (1907–1983), Polish-born communist politician and trade union organiser in Canada
Fred Rose (footballer) (1919–1988), Australian rules footballer
Frederick J Rose (1831–1920), Headmaster-Superintendent of Victorian School for Deaf Children
Frederick P. Rose (1923–1999), American real estate developer and philanthropist

See also
 Fred Rosen (disambiguation)